Eamon Heery is a former Gaelic footballer who played for the Dublin county team. He was awarded an All Star for his performances with Dublin in 1992. He won an All-Ireland Minor Football Championship medal with Dublin in 1982.

External links
Official Dublin Website

Year of birth missing (living people)
Living people
Dublin inter-county Gaelic footballers
Gaelic football backs
People educated at St. Joseph's CBS, Fairview